Igumnitsevo is a rural locality (a village) and the administrative center of Botanovskoye Rural Settlement, Mezhdurechensky District, Vologda Oblast, Russia. The population was 415 as of 2002. There are 8 streets.

Geography 
Igumnitsevo is located 30 km southwest of Shuyskoye (the district's administrative centre) by road. Ushakovo is the nearest rural locality.

References 

Rural localities in Mezhdurechensky District, Vologda Oblast